Pope Gregory IX (r. 1227–1241) created sixteen cardinals in five consistories that he held throughout his pontificate. This included three future successors (Celestine IV, Innocent IV, and Alexander IV) in the first allocation in 1227.

18 September 1227
 Jean Halgrin O.S.B. Clun.
 Goffredo Castiglioni
 Rinaldo Conti di Segni
 Sinibaldo Fieschi
 Barthélemy
 Otto of Tonengo

December 1228
 Jacques de Vitry Can. Reg. O.S.A.
 Niccolò Conti di Segni

September 1231
 Giacomo da Pecorara O.Cist.
 Simon de Sully
 Raymond de Pons

1237
 
 François Cassard
 Guy

1239
 Robert Somercotes
 St. Ramón Nonato O. de M.

Notes and references

Sources

College of Cardinals
Gregory IX
Gregory
13th-century Catholicism
Pope Gregory IX